Bingham railway station serves the market town of Bingham, Nottinghamshire, England. The station is 8½ miles (14 km) east of Nottingham on the Nottingham-Skegness Line. The station is operated and served by East Midlands Railway.

History

Passenger services started on 15 July 1850. It is located on the line first opened by the Ambergate, Nottingham, Boston and Eastern Junction Railway and taken over by the Great Northern Railway. The buildings were designed by Thomas Chambers Hine.

In 1851 the first station master, Thomas Hand, absconded with five days' takings from passengers travelling to the Nottingham Fair.

Between 1879 and 1953, Bingham was also served by Bingham Road station on the Great Northern and London and North Western Joint Railway. It was used for London and North Western Railway services between Nottingham London Road and stations to Northampton.

From 7 January 1963 passenger steam trains between Grantham, Bottesford, Elton and Orston, Aslockton, Bingham, Radcliffe-on-Trent, Netherfield and Colwick, Nottingham London-road (High Level) and Nottingham (Victoria) were replaced by diesel multiple-unit trains.

Station masters

Thomas Hand, 1850–1851
Robert Nicholson, c. 1865
J. W. Page (afterwards station master at Harby and Stathern)
Charles Richardson, 1877–1898
George Tagg
Mr Chandler, up to 1902 (afterwards station master at Little Bytham)
John Thomas James, c. 1913
A. Smith, up to 1937 (afterwards station master at Loughborough Central)
Albert S. Langford, c. 1940 – c. 1945
F. L. Cantwell, c. 1959–1961
J. H. Fisher, from 1961

Services
There is generally an hourly service daily westbound to Nottingham and eastbound towards Grantham and Skegness.

References

External links

Evacuees arriving at Bingham station

Railway stations in Nottinghamshire
DfT Category F1 stations
Former Great Northern Railway stations
Railway stations in Great Britain opened in 1850
Railway stations served by East Midlands Railway
Thomas Chambers Hine railway stations
1850 establishments in England
Bingham, Nottinghamshire